Solms-laubachia himalayensis is a flowering plant in the family Brassicaceae. The specific epithet  is from the Latin, meaning "Himalayan".

Description
The racemes feature from 6 to 25 flowers. These flowers are purple or lilac with a yellow centre. Its brown seeds are ovate. The plant flowers from June to August and fruits from July to October.

Distribution and habitat
Solms-laubachia himalayensis is a high-altitude species growing naturally in Nepal, the western Himalayas and Tibet. Along with Ranunculus trivedii, it is the highest altitude flowering plant on record.

References

Brassicaceae
Flora of Nepal
Flora of West Himalaya
Flora of Tibet
Plants described in 1844